The Lian River or Lianzhuang River   is a tributary of the Qu River in Yunnan province, southwestern China. The Lian rises in northern Shiping County and flows northwestward into the Eshan Yi Autonomous County. The river then turns northeast, passing Shuangjiang Subdistrict (the county seat of Eshan County), and flows into Qu River.

Notes

Rivers of Yunnan
Geography of Honghe Hani and Yi Autonomous Prefecture
Geography of Yuxi